is a Japanese politician, an independent and member of the House of Councillors in the Diet (national legislature). A native of Shirakawa, Gifu and graduate of Seijo University, he was elected to the House of Councillors for the first time in 1981 as a member of the Liberal Democratic Party. After serving in the House of Representatives for four terms from 1993 until 2005 when he lost re-election, he was elected again to the House of Councillors in 2007.

He joined the Sunrise Party of Japan on April 10, 2010. In 2012 that party merged with another party to become the Japan Restoration Party. In 2014 the former Sunrise Party members, led by Shintaro Ishihara and including Fujii, split from the Restoration Party to form the Party for Future Generations. He was appointed as the inaugural chairman of the party's executive council and also head of the party's electoral strategy committee. In the December 2014 general election he was the party's candidate for the Tokai proportional block but lost his seat. After the election he replaced Hiroyuki Sonoda as an advisor to the party.

In September 2015 he left the Party for Future Generations and submitted an application to the Gifu Prefecture branch of the Liberal Democratic Party and was granted re-entry to the party.

References

External links 
 Official website in Japanese.

1943 births
Living people
Government ministers of Japan
Members of the House of Representatives (Japan)
Members of the House of Councillors (Japan)
Sunrise Party politicians
Liberal Democratic Party (Japan) politicians
Party for Japanese Kokoro politicians
21st-century Japanese politicians
Seijo University alumni